"Rubberband Banks" is a song by American hip hop recording artist Young Dro, released as the second single from his debut studio album Best Thang Smokin' (2006). The song, like its predecessor, was produced by Grand Hustle in-house producer Cordale "Lil' C" Quinn. The song's title refers to the act of storing large quantities of banknotes using rubber bands.

Charts

References 

2006 singles
2006 songs
Young Dro songs
Grand Hustle Records singles
Atlantic Records singles
Songs written by Lil' C (record producer)